The Feynman–Kac formula, named after Richard Feynman and Mark Kac, establishes a link between parabolic partial differential equations (PDEs) and stochastic processes. In 1947, when Kac and Feynman were both Cornell faculty, Kac attended a presentation of Feynman's and remarked that the two of them were working on the same thing from different directions. The Feynman–Kac formula resulted, which proves rigorously the real case of Feynman's path integrals. The complex case, which occurs when a particle's spin is included, is still an open question.

It offers a method of solving certain partial differential equations by simulating random paths of a stochastic process. Conversely, an important class of expectations of random processes can be computed by deterministic methods.

Theorem 
Consider the partial differential equation

Then the Feynman–Kac formula tells us that the solution can be written as a conditional expectationunder the probability measure  such that  is an Itô process driven by the equation

Partial proof 
A proof that the above formula is a solution of the differential equation is long, difficult and not presented here. It is however reasonably straightforward to show that, if a solution exists, it must have the above form. The proof of that lesser result is as follows:

Let  be the solution to the above partial differential equation.  Applying the product rule for Itô processes to the process

one gets

Since

 
We also have that

The first term contains, in parentheses, the above partial differential equation and is therefore zero.  What remains is

The desired result is obtained by observing that

and finally

Remarks 
 The expectation formula above is also valid for N-dimensional Itô diffusions. The corresponding partial differential equation for  becomes:  where,  i.e.
 This expectation can then be approximated using Monte Carlo or quasi-Monte Carlo methods.
 When originally published by Kac in 1949, the Feynman–Kac formula was presented as a formula for determining the distribution of certain Wiener functionals. The Feynman–Kac formula says that this expectation is equivalent to the integral of a solution to a diffusion equation. Specifically, under the conditions that ,  where  and  The Feynman–Kac formula can also be interpreted as a method for evaluating functional integrals of a certain form. If  where the integral is taken over all random walks, then  where w(x, t) is a solution to the parabolic partial differential equation  with initial condition .

Applications 
In quantitative finance, the Feynman–Kac formula is used to efficiently calculate solutions to the Black–Scholes equation to price options on stocks and zero-coupon bond prices in affine term structure models.

In quantum chemistry, it is used to solve the Schrödinger equation with the Pure Diffusion Monte Carlo method.

See also 
 Itô's lemma
 Kunita–Watanabe inequality
 Girsanov theorem
 Kolmogorov forward equation (also known as Fokker–Planck equation)

References

Further reading 
 
 

Richard Feynman
Stochastic processes
Parabolic partial differential equations
Articles containing proofs
Mathematical finance